Tony Daniels is a Canadian voice actor. He is well known for providing the voices of Uncle Flippy in JoJo's Circus, as well as Jedite and Wiseman in the original English dub of Sailor Moon. He is also known for providing the voice of Gambit in X-Men: The Animated Series and Marvel vs. Capcom series. Daniels also provides voices for CBC Television and CBC News Network and appeared on camera in shows and films including Code Name: Eternity, Gracie's Choice, Get Ed, and Eerie, Indiana: The Other Dimension.

In the mid-2010s, he moved to New York City, however, he still does voice acting for Canadian productions.

Voice acting roles

References

External links

Tony Daniels Official Site
 

Living people
Canadian male film actors
Canadian male television actors
Canadian male video game actors
Canadian male voice actors
Male actors from Toronto
20th-century Canadian male actors
21st-century Canadian male actors
Year of birth missing (living people)